Happy Ghost III is a 1986 Hong Kong comedy film directed by Johnnie To. Produced and written by Raymond Wong, the film stars Wong and Maggie Cheung. This is the third installment in the "Happy Ghost" series, the film is far more frenetically paced than the first two and its much more a film for adults. The film is about a spirit of the late female singer Tsui Pan Han (Maggie Cheung) waits in the afterlife for a chance to be reincarnated. She meets the Godfather (Tsui Hark) who has found an appropriate musical family for her to be reincarnated with. Her opportunity to be born into the new family is ruined when Sam Kwai (Raymond Wong) takes the pregnant wife to the wrong hospital. Pan Han is given one month to find a new body to assume her reincarnation in, and decides in the meantime to harass Sam Kwai. Kwai eventually summons the Happy Ghost to help him out.

Cast 

 Raymond Wong Pak-ming as Steward Pik (朱錦春) - The happy ghost, lost his powers after Pan-Han cut his braid
 Raymond Wong Pak-ming as Hong Sam-Kwai (康森貴) - In love with Pan-Han, got send to a insane asylum
 Maggie Cheung as Tsui Pan-Han (徐半香) - Has the power to stop time, in love with Sam-Kwai, got reincarnated in the end
 Fennie Yuen as Thai Cheuk-Yee (戴卓儀) - High school student and prefect, got possessed by Pan-Han many times
 Charine Chan as Yiu-King (姚婛) - High school student, has a crush on Alan
Danny Poon as Alan Cheung Chee-Kit (張子傑) - Transferred high school student, has a crush on Cheuk-Yee, involved with gangsters
 Joh Yin-Ling as Mona (夢娜) - Sam-Kwai's ex-girlfriend
 Charlie Cho as Rock Hudson (洛克遜) - Mona's cousin
 Joseph Koo as Ka-Yan Koo (顧家仁) - Musician, Sandy's husband
 Leung San as Sandy (桑迪) - Ka-Yan's wife, Pan-Han's future mother
 Man-No Chan as Headmistress - Has a crush on Sam-Kwai, fired Sam-Kwai in the end
 Ching Wong as Boss - Alan's gangster boss
 Bing-Chuen Cheung as Boss's thug
 David Wu as Boss's thug
 Tsui Hark as Reincarnation Director
Cheng Siu-Ping as Nurse
Anna Ng Yuen-Yee as Nurse
Sze Kai-Keung as Motorcycle Policeman
 Yue Chi Ming as Doctor
Tony Chow Kwok-Chung as Radio DJ (Voice)

Production 
Happy Ghost III was the first film director Johnnie To had worked for Cinema City and his first film since The Enigmatic Case (1980). To had previously been working in television after the box office failure of The Enigmatic Case. To found the film easy to approach as he did not have to write the script and was told he was not allowed to change it by Cinema City's rules. Tsui Hark appears in the film as the Godfather and also provides the film with the special effects.

Release
Happy Ghost III was a hit for Cinema City and grossed a total of HK$15,339,277 and was the 11th-highest-grossing film of the year in Hong Kong. The film grossed less than its two prequels Happy Ghost and Happy Ghost II, which earned a total of HK$17.4 and HK$16.6 respectively. The film was followed by Happy Ghost 4, which was directed by Clifton Ko. In the Malaysia, the film was launched on TV3 called as Cinema programme slot aired on Friday, 2 December 2022 at 10pm until 11:59pm MST in Cantonese dubbed and Malay subtitle.

See also
Johnnie To filmography
List of Hong Kong films of 1986

Notes

References

External links

 HK Cinemagic entry

1980s Cantonese-language films
1986 comedy films
1986 films
Hong Kong comedy films
Films directed by Johnnie To
1980s ghost films
Hong Kong ghost films
1980s Hong Kong films